Ahmad ibn Isma'il ibn Ali was a minor Abbasid personage and provincial governor who was active in the late eighth and early ninth centuries.

Life
Ahmad was the son of Isma'il and a grandson of Ali ibn Abdallah ibn al-Abbas, and was a first cousin of the first two Abbasid caliphs al-Saffah and al-Mansur. During the caliphate of al-Mahdi he was appointed to the governorship of Mosul (781–783/5) and later became al-Mahdi's final governor of Mecca. Under Harun al-Rashid he was again appointed to Mecca and also served as governor of the Yemen.

In 803 he was appointed as governor of Egypt. During his tenure in that province, he received an appeal from the Aghlabid governor of Ifriqiya Ibrahim ibn al-Aghlab for help to quell disturbances in the region of Tripoli. He remained in Egypt in two years, before being dismissed and replaced with Abdallah ibn Muhammad ibn Ibrahim al-Zaynabi in 805.

Notes

References

 
 
 
 
 
 
 
 

Abbasid governors of Yemen
Abbasid governors of Egypt
Abbasids
8th-century people from the Abbasid Caliphate
9th-century Abbasid governors of Egypt
9th-century Arabs
Abbasid governors of Mecca
Abbasid governors of Mosul